Libreswan is a fork of the Openswan IPsec VPN implementation.

Libreswan is created by almost all of the Openswan developers after a lawsuit about the ownership of the Openswan name was filed against Paul Wouters, the release manager of Openswan, in December 2012. The lawsuit was later settled out of court.

Libreswan supports most of the common type of IPsec configurations people use including configuration like host to host VPN, subnet to subnet VPN.

See also

 StrongSwan

References

External links
 

Virtual private networks
Software forks
Free security software
IPsec